Miladin Pešterac (April 18, 1960 – August 21, 2007) is a former Serbian footballer.

References

External links
 Stats
 
 In memoriam

1960 births
2007 deaths
Serbian footballers
Yugoslav footballers
Association football defenders
FK Napredak Kruševac players
Red Star Belgrade footballers
FK Proleter Zrenjanin players
FK Budućnost Podgorica players
Yugoslav First League players
Real Burgos CF footballers
Expatriate footballers in Spain
People from Aleksandrovac